Welsh orthography uses 29 letters (including eight digraphs) of the Latin script to write native Welsh words as well as established loanwords.

The acute accent, the grave accent, the circumflex (or ) and the diaeresis mark are also used on vowels, but accented letters are not regarded as part of the alphabet.

History 

The earliest samples of written Welsh date from the 6th century and are in the Latin alphabet (see Old Welsh).  The orthography differs from that of modern Welsh, particularly in the use of p, t and c to represent the voiced plosives  in the middle and at the end of words.  Similarly, the voiced fricatives  were written with b and d.

By the Middle Welsh period, this had given way to much variability: although b, d and g were now used to represent , these sounds were also often written as in Old Welsh, while  could be denoted by u, v, Ỽ, f or w. The grapheme k was also used, unlike in the modern alphabet, particularly before front vowels. The disuse of this letter is at least partly due to the publication of William Salesbury's Welsh New Testament and William Morgan's Welsh Bible, whose English printers, with type letter frequencies set for English and Latin, did not have enough k letters in their type cases to spell every  sound as k, so the order went "C for K, because the printers have not so many as the Welsh requireth"; this was not liked at the time, but has become standard usage.

In this period, ð (capitalised as Ð) was also used as a letter, interchangeable with dd, such as the passage in the 1567 New Testament: , which contains both ð and dd.

However, the only real relic of this practice today is the Patagonian placename Trevelin ("mill town"), which in standard Welsh orthography would be .

In 1928 a committee chaired by Sir John Morris-Jones standardised the orthography of modern Welsh.

In 1987, a committee chaired by Professor Stephen J. Williams made further small changes, introducing a j. The conventions established by these committees are not adhered to by all modern writers.

Letter names and sound values 
"N" and "S" indicate variants specific to the northern and southern dialects of Welsh. Throughout Wales an alternative system is also in use in which all consonant letters are named using the corresponding consonant sound plus a schwa (e.g.   for ). In this system the vowels are named as below.
{| class="wikitable"
! Letter
! Name
! Corresponding sounds
! English approximation
|-
| a
| 
| 
| cat (short) / father (long)
|-
| b
| 
| 
| bat
|-
| c
| 
| 
| case
|-
| ch
| 
| 
| No English equivalent; similar to loch in Scottish, but pronounced further back.
|-
| d
| 
| 
| day
|-
| dd
| 
| 
| these
|-
| e
| 
| 
| bed (short) / closest to hey (long)
|-
| f
| 
| 
| of
|-
| ff
| 
| 
| four
|-
| g
| 
| 
| gate
|-
| ng
| 
| 
| thing
|-
| h
| 
| 
| hat
|-
| i
| ,  (S)
| 
| bit (short) / machine (long) / yes (as consonant; before vowels)
|-
| j
| 
| 
| jump (only found in loanwords, usually from English but still in wide use such as jeli (jelly) IPA: /dʒɛlɪ/)
|-
| l
| 
| 
| lad
|-
| ll
| 
| 
| not present in English; a voiceless alveolar lateral fricative. A bit like what the consonant cluster "hl" would sound like.
|-
| m
| 
| 
| mat
|-
| n
| 
| 
| net
|-
| o
| 
| 
| Short, like "bog" in RP; long like stove in Scottish English, North Central American English and Standard Canadian English
|-
| p
| 
| 
| pet
|-
| ph
| 
| 
| phone
|-
| r
| 
| 
| Rolled R
|-
| rh
| 
| 
| Voiceless rolled R
|-
| s
| 
| 
| sat
|-
| t
| 
| 
| stick
|-
| th
| 
| 
| thin
|-
| u
|  (N),  (S)
|  (N), (S)
| for Southern variants: bit (short) / machine (long); in Northern dialects  not found in English. Identical to "î" and "â" in Romanian, and similar to the "e" in English roses.
|-
| w
| 
| 
| book (short) / pool (long) / wet (as consonant)
|-
| y
| 
|  (N), (S)
|}

Notes

Diphthongs 
{| class="wikitable"
! Orthography
! Northern dialects
! Southern dialects
! English (approximation only)
|-
| ae
| , 
| , 
| eye, may
|-
| ai
| 
| 
| eye
|-
| au
| , 
| , 
| eye. Realised as bet (south) and cat (north) in plural endings.
|-
| aw
| 
| 
| how
|-
| ei
| 
| 
| As in eight
|-
| eu
| 
| 
| As in hight
|-
| ew
| 
| 
| Roughly like Edward with the d removed: E'ward, or Cockney pronunciation of -ell in words like well, hell.
|-
| ey
| 
| 
| Two distinct vowels.
|-
| iw
| 
| 
| not usually present in English except in the interjection Ew!; closest to 'i-oo' (short i). A small number of English dialects have this sound in words that have "ew" or "ue". Such words, in the majority of English dialects that distinguish ew/ue and oo, would usually have /ju/ instead. See the Phonological history of English consonant clusters article for more information.
|-
| oe
| 
| 
| boy
|-
| oi
| 
| 
| boy
|-
| ou
| 
| 
| boy
|-
| ow
| 
| 
| throw, Owen, owe
|-
| uw
| 
| 
| not present in English; closest to 'i-oo' (short i)
|-
| wy
| 
| 
| not present in English; closest to gooey
|-
| yw
| 
| 
|  not present in English; closest to 'i-oo' (short i) like "goat" in Received Pronunciation or like "house" in Canadian English
|}

Diacritics 
Welsh makes use of a number of diacritics.

The circumflex (ˆ) is mostly used to mark long vowels, so â, ê, î, ô, û, ŵ, ŷ are always long. However, not all long vowels are marked with a circumflex, so the letters a, e, i, o, u, w, y with no circumflex do not necessarily represent short vowels; see .

The grave accent (`) is sometimes used, usually in words borrowed from another language, to mark vowels that are short when a long vowel would normally be expected, e.g.   (a cough),   (a pass/permit or a lift in a car);   (smoke),   (a mug).

The acute accent (´) is sometimes used to mark a stressed final syllable in a polysyllabic word. However, not all polysyllabic words with final stress are marked with the acute accent ( "Welsh" and  "forward/onward", for example, are written with none). The acute may also be used to indicate that a letter w represents a vowel where a glide might otherwise be expected, e.g.

Similarly, the diaeresis (¨) is used to indicate that two adjoining vowels are to be pronounced separately (not as a diphthong). However, it is also used to show that the letter i is used to represent the cluster  which is always followed by another vowel, e.g.  (to copy) pronounced , not .

The grave and acute accents in particular are very often omitted in casual writing, and the same is true to a lesser extent of the diaeresis. The circumflex, however, is usually included. Accented vowels are not considered distinct letters for the purpose of collation.

Predicting vowel length from orthography 
As mentioned above, vowels marked with the circumflex are always long, and those marked with the grave accent are always short. If a vowel is not marked with a diacritic, its length must be determined by its environment; the rules vary a bit according to dialect.

In all dialects, only stressed vowels may be long; unstressed vowels are always short.

An unmarked (stressed) vowel is long:
 in the last syllable of a word when no consonant follows:   (good).
 before voiced stops b, d, g and before all fricatives (except for ll) ch, dd, f, ff, th, s:   (son),   (favourite),   (thing),   (night).

An unmarked vowel is short:
 in an unstressed (proclitic) word:  .
 before p, t, c, ng:   (gate),   (sheepfold),   (ship)
 before most consonant clusters:   (saint),   (hedge),   (April).

The vowel y, when it is pronounced , is always short even when it appears in an environment where other vowels would be long:  (whole) .

Before l, m, n, and r, unmarked vowels are long in some words and short in others:
{|
|- style="text-align:left;"
! vowel
!  
! long  !!  !!  
!  
! short !!  !!  
|-
! i
|  
|   ||  ||  (wine)
|  
|   ||   ||  (scarcely)
|-
! e
|  
|    ||   ||  (old)
|  
|    ||    ||  (head)
|-
! y
|  
|    ||  ||  (man)
|  
|   ||  ||  (white)
|-
! w
|  
|  ||   ||  (bank up a fire)
|  
|   ||     ||  (often)
|-
! e
|  
|  ||  ||  (holly)
|  
|  ||  ||  (heart)
|}

(The last four examples are given in South Welsh pronunciation only since vowels in nonfinal syllables are always short in North Welsh.)

Before nn and rr, vowels are always short:   (ash trees),   (to win),   (stone).

In Northern dialects, long vowels are stressed and appear in the final syllable of the word. Vowels in non-final syllables are always short. In addition to the rules above, a vowel is long in the North before a consonant cluster beginning with s:   (witness). Before ll, a vowel is short when no consonant follows the ll:  (better)  It is long when another consonant does follow the ll:   (hair).

In Southern dialects, long vowels may appear in a stressed penultimate syllable as well as in a stressed word-final syllable. Before ll, a stressed vowel in the last syllable can be either long (e.g.  "better" ) or short (e.g.  "hole" ). However, a stressed vowel in the penult before ll is always short:   (clothes).
Before s, a stressed vowel in the last syllable is long, as mentioned above, but a stressed vowel in the penult is short:  (measure) . Vowels are always short before consonant clusters:   (saint),   (hair),   (witness).

Digraphs 
While the digraphs ch, dd, ff, ng, ll, ph, rh, th are each written with two symbols, they are all considered to be single letters.  This means, for example that  (a town in South Wales) is considered to have only six letters in Welsh, compared to eight letters in English.  Consequently, they each take up only a single space in Welsh crosswords. Ll itself had actually been written as a ligature in Middle Welsh.

Sorting is done in correspondence with the alphabet. For example,  comes before , which comes before , which comes before .  Automated sorting may occasionally be complicated by the fact that additional information may be needed to distinguish a genuine digraph from a juxtaposition of letters; for example  comes after  (in which the  stands for ) but before  (in which n and g are pronounced separately as ).

Although the digraphs above are considered to be single letters, only their first component letter is capitalised when a word in lower case requires an initial capital letter. Thus:
 , etc. (place names)
 , etc. (personal names)
  (other sentences starting with a digraph)
The two letters in a digraph are both capitalised only when the whole word is in uppercase:
  (as on a poster or sign)

The status of the digraphs as single letters is reflected in the stylised forms used in the logos of the National Library of Wales (logo) and Cardiff University
(logo).

See also 
Bardic Alphabet
Welsh Braille

References

External links 

 Type Welsh characters online
 Type Welsh accents in Word
 Welsh pronunciation course with audio

Orthography
Indo-European Latin-script orthographies